Floripes "Lola" Dornellas de Jesus (Mercês, state of Minas Gerais, Brazil, June 09, 1913 - Rio Pomba, Minas Gerais, April 9, 1999) was a Brazilian Roman Catholic laywoman who became famous for living for about 60 years of her life eating only the Eucharistic communion. She is now a Servant of God.

Biography 
Born in the city of Mercês, she moved with her family to Rio Pomba around the age of four.

Accident 
Her childhood and adolescence was marked by the common activities of country life, until, in the 1930s, a fall from a jabuticabeira tree caused her to become paraplegic. Since then, in the midst of severe pain, she had gradually begun to reduce her diet until she completely suppressed it. Then, evident alterations were noticed in her body, since she no longer felt hungry, hungry or sleep.

Increased popularity 
In the first years in which the phenomenon was observed, thousands of people came to its site, in search of prayers and requests for miracles, even awakening the attention of the press.

Until the then Archbishop of Mariana, Don Helvécio Gomes de Oliveira, in 1958, asked Lola to stop the pilgrimages and leave herself to a more withdrawn life, since her health seemed too weak.

Apostolate 
Lola was totally averse to the dissemination of her own figure, striving to spread only devotion to the Sacred Heart of Jesus, inspired by the Movement of the Apostolate of Prayer. The work of creating the Male Prayer Apostolate, which in the city of Rio Pomba, reached the number of 1 000 followers, was especially highlighted. Her main request was to make the novena of the first Fridays of the month, dedicated to the Heart of Jesus, a devotion taught by Jesus in an apparition to St Margaret Mary Alacoque.

Death 
More than 20,000 people came to her burial in Rio Pomba on April 10, 1999.

Servant of God 
Lola was declared Servant of God by the Apostolic Holy See through Protocol Nihil Obstat No. 2699 on November 30, 2005.

External links 
 Official website

References 

1913 births
1999 deaths
People from Minas Gerais
Brazilian Servants of God